Abqad (also Romanized as Ābqad) is a village in Golmakan Rural District, Golmakan District, Golbahar County, Razavi Khorasan Province, Iran. At the 2006 census, its population was 480, in 132 families.

See also 

 List of cities, towns and villages in Razavi Khorasan Province

References 

Populated places in Chenaran County